Marko Stojanović (born 1 February 1998) is a Serbian professional footballer who plays as an attacking midfielder for OFK Žarkovo.

Career
On 26 January 2019, OFK Vršac announced that they had signed Stojanović on loan. Ahead of the 2019/20 season, he then joined FK Zlatibor Čajetina.

References

External links

1998 births
Footballers from Belgrade
Living people
Serbian footballers
Association football midfielders
FK Rad players
FK Zlatibor Čajetina players
FK Smederevo players
FC Slavia Mozyr players
OFK Žarkovo players
Serbian SuperLiga players
Serbian First League players
Belarusian Premier League players
Serbian expatriate footballers
Expatriate footballers in Belarus
Serbian expatriate sportspeople in Belarus